Leptocarydion is a genus of African and Arabic plants in the grass family.

 Species
The only known species is Leptocarydion vulpiastrum, native to Africa from Eritrea to KwaZulu-Natal, plus Yemen and Madagascar.

References

Chloridoideae
Monotypic Poaceae genera
Grasses of Africa
Grasses of Asia
Flora of the Arabian Peninsula
Flora of Madagascar
Flora of Yemen
Afromontane flora